Philip Hugh Slater (1 April 1876 – 20 August 1958) was an English first-class cricketer active 1907–11 who played for Surrey. He was born in Canterbury; died in Fleet, Hampshire.

References

1876 births
1958 deaths
English cricketers
Surrey cricketers